Teerakiat Jaroensettasin (born 3 November 1962) is a Thai physician and politician. He served in first Prayuth Chan-o-cha cabinet from 2015 to 2019. He also won the Gusi Peace Price Award in 2019.

References

Teerakiat Jaroensettasin
Living people
1962 births
Teerakiat Jaroensettasin
Teerakiat Jaroensettasin